The Congressional Center Aisle Caucus  is a group in the United States Congress who has a strong interest in promoting civility of Congress and change the atmosphere in which Congress works. They aim at bringing the two political parties together to work toward creating a "gray area" where tough decisions can be worked out.

The Congressional Center Aisle Caucus is bipartisan.

Executive Board Members 
Steve Israel (NY-2), Democrat
Tim Johnson (IL-15), Republican

Associate Members 
Dave Loebsack (IA-2), Democrat
Bobby Scott (VA-3), Democrat

Senators

Other Supporters 
Former Speaker of the House Tom Foley, Democrat
Former House Majority Leader Bob Michel, Republican

External links 

 Broder, David S. (2005). 'Center Aisle' Civility". Washington Post

Center Aisle